Kelidar (also Romanized as Kelīdar, Kalidār, and Kilīd Dār; also known as Kalīdar Zeyārat) is a village in Sarvelayat Rural District, Sarvelayat District, Nishapur County, Razavi Khorasan Province, Iran. At the 2006 census, its population was 457, in 139 families.

References 

Populated places in Nishapur County